Rosebud-Lott High School is a public high school in Lott, Texas (USA) and classified as a 2A school by the UIL. It is part of the Rosebud-Lott Independent School District in southwestern Falls County.  The school was founded in 1970 when Rosebud High School and Lott High School were consolidated. In 2015, the school was rated "Met Standard" by the Texas Education Agency.

Athletics
The Rosebud-Lott Cougars compete in these sports:

Baseball
Basketball
Cross Country
Football
Golf
Powerlifting
Softball
Track and Field
Volleyball

State titles
Football
2002(2A/D2)
Boys Track
2014 (2A)

References

External links
Rosebud-Lott ISD

High schools in Central Texas
Schools in Falls County, Texas
Public high schools in Texas